Shap Abbey was a religious house of the Premonstratensian order of Canons regular situated on the western bank of the River Lowther in the civil parish of Shap Rural, around  from the village of Shap, in the Eden District of Cumbria, England. The site is in the care of English Heritage and managed on its behalf by the Lake District National Park.

History
Although the present Shap Abbey was built in 1199, the monastic community was founded on another site 20 miles south near Kendal in 1190, but it moved to the present site, then called 'Hepp', in 1199. The old name meant 'a heap' but it gradually assumed the present-day name "Shap" over the next 100 years.

One of the abbots was the impressive Richard Redman (died 1505), later  successively  Bishop of St Asaph (c. 1471), Bishop of Exeter (1495), and Bishop of Ely (1501). He is remembered by a magnificent funeral monument in Ely Cathedral

Shap Abbey escaped the initial phase of the Dissolution of the Monasteries in 1536, but it was closed in 1540 and subsequently sold to the Governor of Carlisle. Most of the abbey buildings have been demolished, however the tower remains are still impressive, and the outline of the building plan is clearly visible.

Masonry was robbed away at the end of the 17th century to build Shap Market Hall, and much of the ornate carved stonework was also removed and used in the building of Lowther Castle. Many of the abbey buildings were incorporated into a farmhouse and used as barns, and little has happened to these over the last four centuries as they have formed part of a working farm.

Burials
Robert de Clifford, 1st Baron de Clifford
Robert Clifford, 3rd Baron Clifford
Roger Clifford, 5th Baron Clifford
Henry Clifford, 10th Baron Clifford

Access
The site is open to the public at all reasonable times and entry is free. Facilities are limited to a car park and a short path leading over the fields to the small 16th-century Keld Chapel, now in the care of the National Trust.

External links 

 Shap Abbey information at English Heritage
Illustrated article on Shap Abbey

1190s establishments in England
Religious organizations established in the 1190s
1540 disestablishments in England
English Heritage sites in Cumbria
Monasteries in Cumbria
Premonstratensian monasteries in England
Tourist attractions in Cumbria
Regionally Important Geological / Geomorphological Sites (RIGS) in Cumbria
Christian monasteries established in the 12th century
Monasteries dissolved under the English Reformation